The following is a list of Eastern Illinois Panthers men's basketball head coaches. There have been 15 head coaches of the Panthers in their 113-season history.

Eastern Illinois' current head coach is Marty Simmons. He was hired as the Panthers' head coach in March 2021, replacing Jay Spoonhour, whose contract was not renewed after the 2020–21 season.

References

Eastern Illinois

Eastern Illinois Panthers men's basketball coaches